1976 Ireland rugby union tour of New Zealand and Fiji. The Ireland national rugby union team toured New Zealand and Fiji for the first time in 1976. Although Ireland had first played the All Blacks in 1905, this tour saw Ireland play them away for the first time.
However, the tour is probably best remembered for the final game against Fiji. A tired Ireland team arrived in Fiji only to discover that, as a result of a scheduling mistake, the senior Fiji team were actually on tour in Australia. The Fiji Rugby Union managed to bring together a small group of first-team players and stand-ins. The official attendance was 12,000, but Fijian newspapers reported closer to 17,000, with many locals packed into tight surroundings. The try-line was exceptionally close to the deadball-line, with Tony Ensor at one point running over both the try-line and deadball-line.  As well as playing in extremely hot weather, the teams also had to deal with a pitch invasion by dozens of frogs. Despite Ireland's inexperience with such conditions, they ran out winners, 0–8.  Mike Gibson, Willie Duggan, Philip Orr and Moss Keane all returned to New Zealand with the British Lions for their 1977 tour.

Matches
Scores and results list Ireland's points tally first.

Touring party

Manager: K. Quilligan
Assistant Manager: Roly Meates
Medical Officer: T.C.J. O’Connell
Captain: Tom Grace

Backs

Forwards

See also
 History of rugby union matches between All Blacks and Ireland

References

Ireland national rugby union team tours of New Zealand
Rugby union tours of Fiji
Ireland tour
Ireland tour
1976 in Fijian rugby union
Tour